State Highway 276 (SH 276) is a Texas state highway that runs from Rockwall east to Emory.  This route was designated on July 25, 1960 between Rockwall and Quinlan, replacing FM 1143 and part of FM 35. SH 276 was extended to its current terminus on October 25, 1990, replacing most of FM 35.

History
SH 276 was designated on September 7, 1938 as a route between US 285 southeast of Arno and Mentone. On April 16, 1946, another section from SH 115 to what was then SH 82 (now SH 18) in Kermit was added. On August 12, 1946, that section was transferred to SH 302. On December 1, 1953, SH 276 was transferred to SH 302.

In early 2021 construction began near Quinlan to eliminate the 276/34 concurrency, by rerouting 276 along the south side of Quinlan from its intersection with 34 and reconnecting with the existing 276 west of the city. On February 27, 2023, the new route of 276 was officially opened, while the existing 276 that ran from FM 36 to Downtown Quinlan was shut down in order to be reconstructed into Business SH 276.

Business Routes
In 2023, SH 276 will soon have one business route. The business route is the former route of 276 that will begin at the west side of town, pass through Downtown Quinlan before terminating at SH 34 on the north side of town.

Junction list

Gallery

References

External links

276
Transportation in Rockwall County, Texas
Transportation in Hunt County, Texas
Transportation in Rains County, Texas